{{Infobox film
| image = Queer Duck - the Movie.jpg
| caption = DVD cover for Queer Duck: The Movie
| director = Xeth Feinberg
| writer = Mike Reiss
| based_on = Queer Duck
| producer = 
| starring = 
| narrator = Nick Jameson
| cinematography = Ian Fleming 
| editing = Damon P. Yoches
| music = Sam Elwitt
| studio = Disgrace Films Icebox 2.0
| distributor = Paramount Home Entertainment
| released = 
| runtime = 72 minutes
| country = United States United Kingdom Canada
| language = English
| budget = $5,000,000
}}Queer Duck: The Movie is a 2006 adult animated film based on the web series Queer Duck, produced by Icebox.com for Mishmash Media, Inc. The film first aired on the gay-themed channel Logo on July 16, 2006, and then had a direct-to-DVD release on July 18, 2006, from Paramount Home Entertainment. On September 16, 2016, it aired on Teletoon's nighttime programming block, Teletoon at Night.

The film reunites the original creators and cast of Queer Duck, plus special guest stars Conan O'Brien as himself, Tim Curry as Peccery the butler, Jeff Glen Bennett as the main antagonist; a homophobic bigoted priest named Reverend Vandergelding, Mark Hamill as a hot dog vendor, Bruce Vilanch as himself, Andy Dick as former drag queen Rex (formerly Regina), Jackie Hoffman as Broadway actress Lola Buzzard, April Winchell doing additional voices, and David Duchovny as "Tiny Jesus".

Plot
The film focuses on Queer Duck who wakes up from a late night party and watches a commercial for an amusement park called Happyland. Declaring it a gay day for the park ("Gay Day at Happyland"), they were closed down by the officials and were told to leave because they were gay. Soaking in bed, he realized that there's no point in being homosexual if almost everyone is against it. During work, he meets the quirky, energetic and suave Broadway actor Lola Buzzard (Jackie Hoffman) which stroke his heart from her sweet and sassyness along with her upbeat attitude ("Smile, Damn You, Smile"). He encourages her to do Broadway acting once more which she does in a play called "Still Not Dead", which she won an award from Rosie O'Donnell at the Tonys. Because he starts developing a crush on her, he is deciding whenever to stay gay or turn straight. Oscar Wildcat insisted that marrying Lola would be his only chance of a relationship unlike his chance. During his youth, in the 1960s, since homosexuality was a crime, gay bars were hidden and disguised and only revealed at times when authorities were gone. When he went to the bar, he meets a drag queen named Rex who calls herself Regina as she sings "Shangalang" with her band, The Blueballs. The two dance and before they kissed, the Stonewall riots occurred and he was separated from Regina and beaten up but he managed to keep his sixties earring as a remembrance becoming a nipple ring. This decision also has an effect on his lover, Openly Gator who wants Queer Duck to accept for who he is without change. Queer Duck asks Openly Gator about this and he states (in hidden emotion) that whatever makes Queer Duck happy will make him happy. Queer Duck decides to marry Lola but needs help turning straight so Lola recommends him to a homophobic bigoted priest named Reverend Vandergelding who can turn him straight. All of the reverend's procedures failed and so he creates an elixir that turns him straight. When Queer Duck drinks it, he is muscle bounded, becomes fat, straight and monotonish and marries Lola Buzzard until her unexpected death, leaving him to wish to turn gay again. Openly Gator, still sad from losing his lover, takes his frustrations out on Conan O'Brien who keeps eating at the restaurant. He also plans to stop Queer Duck's wedding before he realizes that Queer Duck didn't show up and when he did, he told him to beat it and called him a "homo".

After turning gay by Barbra Streisand, he loses the love of his life; Openly Gator, who states that he's in a relationship with Liza Minnelli thinking that the Liza he got was just an imitator but it turns out to be the real one, but gains respect and independence of homosexuals. The reverend was arrested for kidnapping and intoxicating clients after Queer Duck returned to him as a gay man again in which he threatened him in response. Lola gave all of her fortune to Queer Duck when she died and so, he used it by buying the gay bashing theme park Happyland, giving Bi-Polar Bear a baseball stadium since as a child, he always gets picked last ("Baseball is Gay"), and gave Oscar Wildcat his own antique variety show. Oscar reunites with Regina as she tries to pawn off her earring. Regina has become Rex again and gave up his drag life, being a customer of Reverend Vandergelding. Oscar, realizing that he can stay a homosexual and get the love of his life, shows him her earring he snatched. Since they now recognise each other from when they were young, they no longer have to worry since there both gay and they save sex on national TV. Vandergelding is so irritated with so much references of homosexuality from Oscar's live sex routine to the announcement of the world's first gay theme park, that he escapes prison, kidnaps Queer Duck and vows to pour his big pot of elixir all over Fairy Land (formerly Happyland) to turn all gay people into heterosexuals, but Openly Gator, after hearing that Queer Duck is in trouble when he was assigned as a captain of a ride in the park by his agent, comes to the rescue and stops the Reverend and kicks him out where he is splashed with his own elixir and pink hair is stuck on him, in which a gay bull charges him and kisses him, thinking he was another bull.

Openly Gator and Queer Duck kiss and make up, which Queer Duck states that he's gay to stay, which they end the movie with their last hit number "I'm Glad I'm Gay".

Production
All of the Queer Duck'' production staff from Icebox.com returned for the movie. It was originally going to be produced and aired by its TV network Showtime but since the network quit supporting gay shows, the series was dropped and it became a full Icebox production.  The animation has improved a little, such as Queer Duck frolicking more smoothly, Openly Gator's mouth being shorter and Oscar Wildcat gaining weight, but still had the limited animation style from the webisodes. Also, the theater sign that says "Queer Duck - The Musical" changed to "Queer Duck - The Movie" to support the movie. The theme song has also extended as well. Footage of each actors recording sessions were provided in the credits.

Several past characters such as Queer Duck's family return for the film and just like the original series, several celebrities were parodied and voiced by imitators, with the exceptions of Bruce Villanch and Conan O'Brien. Unlike the original series, non-celebrity humans also appear such as the gay baseball players, a hot dog vendor (Mark Hamill) and the Happy Family who own the themepark Happyland, now Fairyland. The film was released to DVD in all the US except Utah. This was their latest Queer Duck and presumably final one since 2001. It was the first Internet animation to be screened during the Polish Festival of Equality 2008 in Warsaw. Creator Mike Reiss considered the film the "best thing he ever wrote".

Cast

Voice cast
 Jim J. Bullock as Adam Seymour "Queer Duck" Duckstein: A gay duck who works as a nurse and gained the fortune from his ex-wife Lola Buzzard, who died, which he used to make the world's first gay theme park and made his friends' dreams come true.
 Jackie Hoffman as Lola Buzzard: A 78-year-old Broadway actress who was full of power and married Queer Duck before her death which was caused from too much toxin in her blood.
 Kevin Michael Richardson as Steven Arlo "Openly" Gator: Queer Duck's longtime partner who works as a waiter in a restaurant called T.S. It's Monday which he often sobs that Queer Duck is not accepting himself for who he is and takes his frustrations out on Conan O'Brien. His voice is a reminiscent to Harvey Fierstein. Richardson also provides additional voices.
 Billy West as Bi Polar Bear: One of Queer Duck's friends with a chuckling laugh who makes funny jokes that he only laughs at. He was always picked last at baseball and then Queer Duck bought him his own baseball stadium and team. His voice is a reminiscent to Paul Lynde. He works at a perfume stand in a mall. West also provides additional voices.
 Maurice LaMarche as Oscar Wildcat: One of Queer Duck's friends, an alcoholic who reunites with a drag queen named Regina (now Rex) who he loved during his youth. He works at the Shirley Temple antique store. LaMarche also voices Morty Duckstein and others.
 Jeff Bennett as Reverend Vandergelding: A bigoted homophobic priest that made Rex and Queer Duck straight and was arrested for intoxicating his clients.
 Tim Curry as Peccary: Lola's (formerly) and Queer Duck's metrosexual pig butler who loves to drive the limousine very fast and has an affair with a hot dog vendor.
 Conan O'Brien as himself
 David Duchovny as Tiny Jesus: A miniature model of Jesus Christ on a cross that makes some small lines towards the end of the film.

Other voices
 Bruce Vilanch as himself
 Estelle Harris as Mrs. Duckstein 
 Tress MacNeille as Melissa, Joan Rivers and others
 Andy Dick as Regina/Rex
 Mark Hamill as A hot dog vendor, Police Officer, Owl Doctor 
 Debi Mae West
 Howard Hoffman
 Barbara Goodson
 April Winchell
 Kevin Chamberlin
 Nick Jameson
 Chris Cox as Michael Jackson
 Audrey Wasilewski as Rosie O'Donnell

References

External links

 
 Queer Duck: The Movie at AllMovie
 

LGBT-related animated films
American adult animated films
American flash animated films
American LGBT-related films
British adult animated films
British LGBT-related films
Canadian adult animated films
Canadian LGBT-related films
Adult animated comedy films
Paramount Pictures animated films
Animated films about ducks
Gay-related films
2006 LGBT-related films
Paramount Pictures direct-to-video films
2006 films
2000s musical comedy-drama films
Animated films about animals
Animated films based on animated series
2000s English-language films
2000s American films
Homophobia in fiction
Films about anti-LGBT sentiment
Films about bears
Films about cats